The Battle of Bennington was a battle of the American Revolutionary War, part of the Saratoga campaign, that took place on August 16, 1777, on a farm in Walloomsac, New York, about  from its namesake, Bennington, Vermont. A rebel force of 2,000 men, primarily New Hampshire and Massachusetts militiamen, led by General John Stark, and reinforced by Vermont militiamen led by Colonel Seth Warner and members of the Green Mountain Boys, decisively defeated a detachment of General John Burgoyne's army led by Lieutenant Colonel Friedrich Baum, and supported by additional men under Lieutenant Colonel Heinrich von Breymann.

Baum's detachment was a mixed force of 700, composed primarily of dismounted Brunswick dragoons, Canadians, Loyalists and Indians. He was sent by Burgoyne to raid Bennington in the disputed New Hampshire Grants area for horses, draft animals, provisions, and other supplies. Believing the town to be only lightly defended, Burgoyne and Baum were unaware that Stark and 1,500 militiamen were stationed there. After a rain-caused standoff, Stark's men enveloped Baum's position, taking many prisoners, and killing Baum. Reinforcements for both sides arrived as Stark and his men were mopping up, and the battle restarted, with Warner and Stark driving away Breymann's reinforcements with heavy casualties.

The battle was a major strategic success for the American cause and is considered part of the turning point of the Revolutionary War; it reduced Burgoyne's army in size by almost 1,000 men, led his Native American supporters to largely abandon him, and deprived him of much-needed supplies, such as mounts for his cavalry regiments, draft animals and provisions, all factors that contributed to Burgoyne's eventual defeat at Saratoga. The victory galvanized colonial support for the independence movement, and played a key role in bringing France into the war on the rebel side. The battle's anniversary is celebrated in the state of Vermont as Bennington Battle Day.

Background

With the American Revolutionary War two years old, the British changed their plans. Giving up on the rebellious New England colonies, they decided to split the Thirteen Colonies and isolate New England from what the British believed to be the more loyal southern colonies.  The British command devised a grand plan to divide the colonies via a three-way pincer movement towards Albany. The western pincer, proceeding eastward from Lake Ontario under the command of Barry St. Leger, was repulsed when the Siege of Fort Stanwix failed, and the southern pincer, which was to progress up the Hudson valley from New York City, never started since General William Howe decided instead to capture Philadelphia.

The northern pincer, proceeding southward from Montreal, enjoyed the most success.  After the British victories at Fort Ticonderoga, Hubbardton, and Fort Anne, General John Burgoyne proceeded with the Saratoga campaign, with the goal of capturing Albany and gaining control of the Hudson River Valley, where Burgoyne's force could (as the plan went) meet the other pincers, dividing the colonies in two.

British forces
Burgoyne's progress towards Albany had initially met with some success, including the scattering of Seth Warner's men in the Battle of Hubbardton. However, his advance had slowed to a crawl by late July, due to logistical difficulties, exacerbated by the American destruction of a key road, and the army's supplies began to dwindle. Burgoyne's concern over supplies was magnified in early August when he received word from Howe that he (Howe) was going to Philadelphia, and was not in fact going to advance up the Hudson River valley. In response to a proposal first made on July 22 by the commander of his German troops, Baron Riedesel, Burgoyne sent a detachment of about 800 troops under the command of Lieutenant Colonel Friedrich Baum from Fort Miller on a foraging mission to acquire horses for the German dragoons, draft animals to assist in moving the army, and to harass the enemy. Baum's detachment was primarily made up of dismounted Brunswick Army dragoons of the Prinz Ludwig regiment. Along the way it was joined by local companies of Loyalists, some Canadians and about 100 Indians, and a company of British sharpshooters. Baum was originally ordered to proceed to the Connecticut River valley where they believed horses could be procured for the dragoons.  However, as Baum was preparing to leave, Burgoyne verbally changed the goal to be a supply depot at Bennington, which was believed to be guarded by the remnants of Warner's brigade, about 400 colonial militia.

American forces
Unknown to Burgoyne, the citizens of the New Hampshire Grants territory (now Vermont, which was then disputed between New York and the Vermont Republic) had appealed to the states of New Hampshire and Massachusetts for protection from the invading army following the British capture of Ticonderoga. New Hampshire responded on July 18 by authorizing John Stark to raise a militia for the defense of the people "or the annoyance of the enemy".  Using funds provided by John Langdon, Stark raised 1,500 New Hampshire militiamen in the space of six days, more than 10% of New Hampshire's male population over the age of sixteen. They were first marched to the Fort at Number 4 (modern Charlestown, New Hampshire), then crossed the Connecticut river border into the Grants and stopped at Manchester, where Stark conferred with Warner. While in Manchester, General Benjamin Lincoln, whose promotion in preference to Stark had been the cause for Stark's resignation from the Continental Army, attempted to assert Army authority over Stark and his men. Stark refused, stating that he was solely responsible to the New Hampshire authorities. Stark then went on to Bennington with Warner as a guide, while Warner's men remained in Manchester. Lincoln returned to the American camp at Stillwater, where he and General Philip Schuyler hatched a plan for Lincoln, with 500 men, to join with Stark and Warner in actions to harass Burgoyne's communications and supply lines at Skenesboro. Baum's movements significantly altered these plans.

Prelude
Baum's Germans left Burgoyne's camp at Fort Edward on August 9 and marched to Fort Miller, where they waited until they were joined by the Indians and a company of British marksmen. The company marched off toward Bennington on August 11. In minor skirmishes along the way they learned from prisoners taken that a sizable force was in place at Bennington.  On August 14 Baum's men encountered a detachment of Stark's men that had been sent out to investigate reports of Indians in the area. Stark's men retreated, destroying a bridge to delay Baum's advance. Stark, on receiving word of the approaching force, sent a request to Manchester for support, and then moved his troops out of Bennington toward Baum's force, setting up a defensive line. Baum sent a message to Burgoyne following the first contact indicating that the American force was larger than expected, but that it was likely to retreat before him. He then advanced a few miles further until he neared Stark's position. He then realized that at least part of his first message was incorrect, so he sent a second message to Burgoyne, requesting reinforcements.

It rained for the next day and a half, preventing battle. During this time, Baum's men constructed a small redoubt at the crest of the hill and hoped that the weather would prevent the Americans from attacking before reinforcements arrived. Stark sent out skirmishers to probe the German lines, and managed to kill thirty Indians in spite of the difficulties of keeping their gunpowder dry. Reinforcements for both sides marched out on the 15th; travel was quite difficult due to the heavy rains. Burgoyne sent 550 men under Heinrich von Breymann, while Warner's company of about 350 Green Mountain Boys came south from Manchester under Lieutenant Samuel Safford's command.

Late on the night of August 15, Stark was awakened by the arrival of Parson Thomas Allen and a band of Massachusetts militiamen from nearby Berkshire County who insisted on joining his force. In response to the minister's fiery threat that his men would never come out again if they were not allowed to participate, Stark is reported to have said, "Would you go now on this dark and rainy night? Go back to your people and tell them to get some rest if they can, and if the Lord gives us sunshine to-morrow and I do not give you fighting enough, I will never call on you to come again." Stark's forces again swelled the next day with the arrival of some Stockbridge Indians, bringing his force (excluding Warner's men) to nearly 2,000 men.

Stark was not the only beneficiary of unexpected reinforcements. Baum's force grew by almost 100 when a group of local Loyalists arrived in his camp on the morning of August 16.

Battle

On the afternoon of August 16, the weather cleared, and Stark ordered his men to be ready to attack. Stark is reputed to have rallied his troops by saying they were here to fight for their "natural born rights as Englishmen" and he added "There are your enemies, the Red Coats and the Tories. They are ours, or this night Molly Stark sleeps a widow." Upon hearing that the militia had melted away into the woods, Baum assumed that the Americans were retreating or redeploying. However, Stark had decided to capitalize on weaknesses in the German's widely distributed position, and had sent sizable flanking parties to either side of his lines. These movements were assisted by a ruse employed by Stark's men that enabled them to get closer safely without alarming the opposing forces. The Germans, most of whom spoke no English, had been told that soldiers with bits of white paper in their hats were Loyalists, and should not be fired on; Stark's men had also heard this and many of them had suitably adorned their hats.

When the fighting broke out around 3:00 PM the German position was immediately surrounded by gunfire, which Stark described as "the hottest engagement I have ever witnessed, resembling a continual clap of thunder." The Loyalists and Indian positions were overrun, causing many of them to flee or surrender. This left Baum and his Brunswick dragoons trapped alone on the high ground. The Germans fought valiantly even after running low on powder and the destruction of their ammunition wagon. In desperation the dragoons led a sabre charge in an attempt to break through the enveloping forces.  The charge failed horrendously, resulting in massive German casualties and gaining no ground on the rebels. Baum was mortally wounded in this final charge, and the remaining Germans surrendered.

After the battle ended, while Stark's militiamen were busy disarming the prisoners and looting their supplies, Breymann arrived with his reinforcements. Seeing the Americans in disarray, they immediately pressed their attack. After hastily regrouping, Stark's forces tried to hold their ground against the new German onslaught, but began to fall back. Before their lines collapsed, Warner's men arrived on the scene to reinforce Stark's troops. Pitched battle continued until dark, when both sides disengaged. Breymann began a hasty retreat; he had lost one quarter of his force and all of his artillery pieces.

Aftermath

Total German and British losses at Bennington were recorded at 207 dead and 700 captured; American losses included 30 Americans dead and 40 wounded. The battle was at times particularly brutal when Loyalists met Patriots, as in some cases they came from the same communities. The prisoners, who were first kept in Bennington, were eventually marched to Boston.

Burgoyne's army was readying to cross the Hudson at Fort Edward on August 17 when the first word of the battle arrived. Believing that reinforcements might be necessary, Burgoyne marched the army toward Bennington until further word arrived that Breymann and the remnants of his force were returning. Stragglers continued to arrive throughout the day and night, while word of the disaster spread within the camp.

The effect on Burgoyne's campaign was significant. Not only had he lost nearly 1,000 men, of which half were regulars, but he also lost the crucial Indian support. In a council following the battle, many of the Indians (who had traveled with him from Quebec) decided to go home. This loss severely hampered Burgoyne's reconnaissance efforts in the days to come. The failure to bring in nearby supplies meant that he had to rely on supply lines that were already dangerously long, and that he eventually broke in September. The shortage of supplies was a significant factor in his decision to surrender at Saratoga, following which France entered the war.

American Patriots reacted to news of the battle with optimism. Especially after Burgoyne's Indian screen left him, small groups of local Patriots began to emerge to harass the fringes of British positions. A significant portion of Stark's force returned home and did not again become influential in the campaign until appearing at Saratoga on October 13 to complete the encirclement of Burgoyne's army.

John Stark's reward from the New Hampshire General Assembly for "the Memorable Battle of Bennington" was "a compleat suit of Clothes becoming his Rank". A reward that Stark likely valued the highest was a message of thanks from John Hancock, president of the Continental Congress, which included a commission as "brigadier in the army of the United States".

Order of battle
The battle forces are generally described as in Morrissey. His numbers are generally consistent with other sources on the British units, although there is disagreement across a wide array of sources on the number of troops under Breymann, which are generally listed at either approximately 550 or 650. Morrissey is also incorrect in identifying some of the American units. He identifies William Gregg as having a separate command; Gregg apparently led several companies in Nichols' regiment. Morrissey also failed to include the Massachusetts militia, and misidentified Langdon's company, erroneously believing they may have been from Worcester, Massachusetts. (Militia companies from the Worcester area marched on Bennington, with some companies arriving the day after the battle.) Langdon originally raised his company in 1776, but it did not become a cavalry unit until 1778.

United States and Vermont troops
New Hampshire militia regiments
Hobart's Regiment of Militia 150
Nichols' Regiment of Militia 550
Stickney's Regiment of Militia 150
Langdon's Company of Light Horse Volunteers (number unknown, were infantry at the time)
Additional New Hampshire militia 1,000
Vermont militia regiments
Herrick's Regiment 300
Additional Vermont Rangers 200
Massachusetts militia regiments
Simonds' Regiment of Militia (number unknown)
Continental Regiments
Warner's additional Continental Regiment (Green Mountain Boys, commanded by Safford) 350

British and German troops
Baum's forces
Prinz Ludwig Dragoons 205
Grenadiers 24
Light infantry 57
Line infantry (from regiments of Riedesel, Specht, and Rhetz) 37
Hesse-Hanau artillery 13
Queen's Loyal Rangers (Peters) over 150
British Marksmen 48
Local Loyalists (Pfister, Covel) over 150
Canadians 56
Indians (Lanaudière, Campbell) over 100
Breymann's forces
Grenadiers 353
Light infantry 277
Hesse-Hanau artillery 20

Commemorations

August 16 is a legal holiday in Vermont, known as Bennington Battle Day. The battlefield, now a New York state historic site, was designated a National Historic Landmark on January 20, 1961, and added to the National Register of Historic Places on October 15, 1966. In the 1870s, the local historic society in Bennington commissioned the design and construction of the Bennington Battle Monument, which was complete in 1889 and dedicated in 1891 with ceremonies attended by President Benjamin Harrison. Although the monument was not ready in time to mark the centennial of the battle, the 100th anniversary of the battle was marked by speeches attended by President Rutherford B. Hayes.

Every year on Bennington Battle Day there is a firing of the Molly Stark Cannon, the oldest firing cannon in the United States. The cannon was captured at the Battle of Bennington.

See also

 List of American Revolutionary War battles
 American Revolutionary War § British northern strategy fails. Places 'Battle of Bennington' in overall sequence and strategic context.
  – aircraft carrier named in honor of the battle

Notes

References

External links

 The Battle of Bennington: An American Victory, a National Park Service Teaching with Historic Places (TwHP) lesson plan
 Official Battlefield page from New York State Office of Parks, Recreation and Historic Preservation
 The Riflemen's Song at Bennington
 Bennington Battlefield on the Historical Marker Database

1777 in the United States
Conflicts in 1777
Bennington County, Vermont
Rensselaer County, New York
Battles of the Saratoga campaign
Bennington
Bennington
New Hampshire in the American Revolution
Bennington
Vermont in the American Revolution
Bennington, Vermont
1777 in New York (state)